Herbert Gribble (23 December 1860 – 12 June 1943) was an English cricketer. He played for Gloucestershire between 1878 and 1882.

References

1860 births
1943 deaths
English cricketers
Gloucestershire cricketers
Cricketers from Bristol